Victor Bateman (4 August 1904 – 29 April 1972) was  a former Australian rules footballer who played with Sturt in the South Australian National Football League (SANFL).

References

External links 		
Vic Bateman's profile at AustralianFootball.com	

1904 births
1972 deaths
Sturt Football Club players
Australian rules footballers from South Australia